A by-election was held for the New South Wales Legislative Assembly electorate of Windsor on 29 July 1880 because Richard Driver died.

Dates

Result

Richard Driver died.

See also
Electoral results for the district of Windsor
List of New South Wales state by-elections

References

1880 elections in Australia
New South Wales state by-elections
1880s in New South Wales